Erhan Çelenk (born 16 March 1989) is a Turkish professional footballer who plays as a midfielder for Bucaspor 1928.

Professional career
A youth product of Trabzon Söğütlüspor and Akçaabat Sebatspor, Çelenk began his career with the latter in 2007. he had stints at Kahramanmaraşspor and Darıca Gençlerbirliği before signing with BB Erzurumspor in 2015. He made his professional debut with Erzurumspor in a 3-2 Süper Lig loss to Konyaspor on 12 August 2018. In 2019, he transferred to Gazişehir Gaziantep before further stints at Akhisarspor and Altay in the TFF First League.

References

External links
 
 
 

1989 births
People from Akçaabat
Living people
Turkish footballers
Association football midfielders
Akçaabat Sebatspor footballers
Kahramanmaraşspor footballers
Darıca Gençlerbirliği footballers
Büyükşehir Belediye Erzurumspor footballers
Gaziantep F.K. footballers
Akhisarspor footballers
Altay S.K. footballers
Manisa FK footballers
Süper Lig players
TFF First League players
TFF Second League players
TFF Third League players